On June 13, 2015, James Boulware shot at the Dallas Police Department from an armored van with what appeared to be a semi-automatic rifle. The shooting occurred at the department's headquarters in the Cedars neighborhood of Dallas, Texas. He then led the police in a chase to nearby Hutchins, where he remained in the van in a standoff with police. The standoff ended when a police sniper fired a round from a .50-caliber rifle, disabling the engine block, as well as additional rounds into the vehicle to kill the driver. After sending in robots to confirm the shooting and attempt to make entry into the vehicle, water charges were used to breach the windshield. Police then verified that the suspect was the only person in the vehicle and that he was dead. Police also found four bags outside of the police headquarters containing pipe bombs.

Attack
At approximately 12:30 a.m. on June 13, a man parked an armored van in front of the Dallas Police Department headquarters. There, he opened fire using what appeared to be a semi-automatic weapon. When police officers responded, the man rammed a Dallas Police patrol car and began shooting at officers from inside the van, striking the squad cars. Further gunfire was exchanged with the police while a perimeter was set up around the van, and a SWAT team was called in.

The driver identified himself to police as James Boulware, and claimed that the police had taken his son, accusing him of "being a terrorist". He then cut off communication with officers after making increasingly agitated and angry rants against police. The driver then threatened to blow the police up. The standoff continued as SWAT officers used a .50-caliber rifle to disable the armored van. The standoff ended when a sniper fired additional rounds into the vehicle, killing the driver.

Police subsequently sent in robots that used water charges to breach the windshield. Police were then able to verify that the suspect was the only person in the vehicle, and that he was deceased. Police robots also used water charges to disable two sets of pipe bombs found in the van.
Due to concerns that the van, which was identified as a purpose-built "Zombie Apocalypse Assault Vehicle and Troop Transport" with gun ports and armor-plated windows, was booby-trapped with explosives, police then destroyed the van in a controlled explosion.  No police officers or civilians were injured in the incident. Four suspicious bags were found at the police headquarters, one of which contained pipe bombs. Another bag exploded while being moved by a police bomb disposal robot, and a third bag found under a police vehicle was detonated by an explosive ordnance disposal team. At 6:19 a.m., the headquarters building was confirmed clear of all explosives.

Suspect
Dallas officers initially stated that up to four suspects were involved in the attack on their headquarters, but later said they believed only one person was involved and the reports of multiple suspects had resulted from him changing positions during the attack. The only clearly identified suspect communicating with police gave his name as James Boulware. News reports confirmed that Boulware was arrested in Paris, Texas, in 2013 after a report of family violence, and several firearms he owned were also confiscated. Boulware's family members then reported to authorities that they were concerned that he might go on a shooting spree after he threatened to kill all the adult members of his family and to shoot up some churches and schools.

Boulware later made threats against a judge in his child custody case after he and the mother of his eleven-year-old son lost custody of their son to Boulware's mother, on the grounds that they were unfit for sole custody of the child.

See also
 2016 shooting of Dallas police officers
 Marvin Heemeyer
 Narco tank
 Vehicular assault as a terrorist tactic
 Boston Marathon bombing

References 

June 2015 crimes in the United States
Non-fatal shootings
2015 in Texas
2015 active shooter incidents in the United States
2010s in Dallas
Anti-police violence in the United States
Crimes against police officers in the United States
Crimes in Dallas
Attacks in the United States in 2015
Dallas Police Department
Deaths by firearm in Texas